Donald Neil McIntosh (born 1 April 1931) is a former New Zealand rugby union player. A flanker, McIntosh represented  at a provincial level, and was a member of the New Zealand national side, the All Blacks, in 1956 and 1957. He played 13 matches for the All Blacks including four internationals.

References

1931 births
Living people
Rugby union players from Lower Hutt
New Zealand rugby union players
New Zealand international rugby union players
Wellington rugby union players
Rugby union flankers